Atypoides riversi, known as turret spider, is a species of mygalomorph spider in the family Antrodiaetidae. It is a medium-sized spider native to Northern California that constructs a burrow with a turret made of soil, vegetation and silk.

Gallery

References

External links

Antrodiaetidae
Spiders of the United States
Spiders described in 1883